The Privia is a line of digital pianos and stage pianos manufactured by Casio. They have 4-layer stereo piano samples and up to 256 notes of polyphony, depending on model. All Privia models feature some kind of weighted keyboard action which simulates the action on an acoustic piano.

First introduced in 2003, the Privia was originally designed to be a new competitor to other brands like Yamaha, Roland, and Kawai in budget digital piano products, but since then more exclusive pianos has been added to the line as well.

Overview 

The original Privia was introduced by Casio in 2003, as a new concept within budget digital pianos, and is widely known for offering more advanced features and high-quality sound at affordable prices, being able to keep up with more expensive instruments. The first Privia was the PX-100. Like any other compact digital pianos, it was able to be played on a table or optional stand, and was equipped with a digital sound source created by independent sampling of various piano timbres.

The first generation Privia was produced from 2003 to 2006, and utilizes the Zygotech Polynomial Interpolation (ZPI) synthesis sound engine, as used in Casio's numerous former flagship keyboards. Second generation follows from 2006 to 2009, using similar sound engine.

The third generation was introduced in 2009, featuring an all new Linear Morphing AiF (Acoustic and Intelligent Filtering) sound engine with 4-level dynamic stereo piano sampling and 128-note polyphony.

The fourth generation is the current version of the Privia, first introduced in 2012 . It uses the improved rendition of Linear Morphing AiF engine, called Multi-Dimensional Acoustic and Intelligent Resonator (AiR) sound engine, featuring a revamped 4-layer sampling and new features such as simulated sympathetic resonance, adjustable key sensor response (referred to as "Hammer Response"), half-damper effect, pedal noises and key-off simulation.

Minor update of fourth generation is introduced in 2015, with some models included color touchscreen and improved built-in speaker system, as well as updated various features with few models has up to 256-note polyphony.

Keyboard action
As with other digital pianos, the Privia features a fully weighted keyboard action to simulate the action on an acoustic piano.

This key action consist of a mechanical system of small "hammers" and weights attached to each keys that will lift up when the key is pressed, while the keys trigger the sensors to generate sound. The sensors are located in the bottom of the keyboard, similar to that of a synthesizer keyboard action

Throughout various incarnations, the key action has undergone several changes over time:

Scaled Hammer Action (2003–2008 models) 
The original keyboard action, featuring a single or double sensors installed below the keybed. The weights are attached far back to the keys, giving it a slight resistance after the keys are released. It is also have a simulated weight in which lower notes are heavier than higher ones.

Tri-Sensor Scaled Hammer Action (2009–2011 models)
Tri-Sensor Scaled Hammer utilizes three individual sensors for each keys, two installed below the key's base, and one installed slightly further back near the hammers. The hammers are also modified to have less resistance and swings back faster upon release. The three sensors ensures precision response and improved touch sensitivity compared to its predecessor.

Tri-Sensor Scaled Hammer Action II (2012–present models)
A revamped incarnation of the previous action. The triple sensors are now installed right below the key's base, while the hammers remain unchanged. Furthermore, this action even features unique keys with simulated synthetic ebony and ivory texture and the sensor's response can be digitally adjusted to match the playing style realistically.

The Scaled Hammer Action II has been described as being harder, more substantial and heavier compared to the previous versions. It is also widely criticized for its characteristic knocking noises when played at medium to high velocities, and considered as being heavier than a generic acoustic piano keys.

Smart Scaled Hammer Action (2019–present models)
Reduces size and weight without compromising playing feel. Included in PX-S1000 and PX-S3000 models.
And the new 2021 models, PX-S1100 and PX-S3100.

Smart Hybrid Hammer Action (2022–present models)
Included in PX-S5000, PX-S6000 and PX-S7000.

Models

Models currently sold in black.

Console models

 2006 : PX-700
 2007 : PX-720
 2008 : PX-800
 2009 : PX-730
 2010 : PX-830
 2012 : PX-750; PX-780 and PX-850
 2013 : PX-A800
 2015 : PX-760 and PX-860
 2017 : PX-770 and PX-870

Standard models

 2003 : PX-100 – the original Privia, with Dual-Element HL sound engine
 2004 : PX-400R – first Privia with LCD display and auto-accompaniment capabilities
 2005 : PX-110 – first model with ZPI Synthesis sound engine
 2005 : PX-310
 2005 : PX-500L
 2006 : PX-300
 2007 : PX-200 – first entry-level Privia model with AiF sound engine
 2007 : PX-320 – first Privia model with AiF sound engine
 2007 : PX-410R – minor upgrade to the PX-500L
 2007/08 : PX-120
 2008 : PX-575 – the last Privia model with ZPI sound engine
 2009 : PX-330 – first Privia model with Linear Morphing; introducing dot-matrix LCD display, replacing the digital alphanumeric display as seen on PX-410R and PX-575
 2009/10 : PX-130/PX-135BK/WE – first entry-level model with Linear Morphing
 2012 : PX-350M – successor to the PX-330, Features the same dot matrix display, new improved 4 layer stereo piano tones with AiR sound engine, a 16 track recorder and new accompaniment capabilities.
 2012 : PX-150 – successor to the PX-130/135 with enhanced sampling system and the first model with the present AiR sound engine
 2013 : PX-A100 – Privia 10th Anniversary model, based on the PX-150 and available in red or blue color
 2015 : PX-160 – successor to the PX-150; minor improvements with enhanced sounds
 2015 : PX-360M/CGP-700 – Successor to the PX-350M; features a color touch screen and improved sounds from its predecessors, with a new proprietary Multi-Expressive Intelligence (MXi) sound engine in collaboration with the default AiR engine, as well as revamped built-in speakers.
 2019 : PX-S1000 and PX-S3000
 2021 : PX-S1100 and PX-S3100
 2022: PX-S5000, PX-S6000 and PX-S7000

The CGP-700 includes a unique stand equipped with built-in amplification and speakers.

The MXi sound engine was later used for Casio's latest MZ-X series of keyboard/synthesizer hybrid instrument, introduced in early 2016

Note: the CGP-700 (2015 model) and PX-A100/A800 Anniversary series (2013 model) was offered only in Japan and Western markets, and not available in other regions.

Stage pianos (Privia PRO series)
 2010 : PX-7WE
 2011 : PX-3BK/WH – Casio's first-ever stage piano model
 2013 : PX-5S – stage ready variation of the PX-350, the PX-5S adds tone editing and controller capabilities and a new Ivory Touch keybed. The internal speakers and accompaniment were removed to a facilitate the new features. The PX-5S weighs under 25 lbs., holding the distinction of being the lightest stage piano ever manufactured.
 2015 : PX-560M – stage ready variation of the PX-360 and CGP-700, featuring the same color touch screen and auto-accompaniment function, but added synthesizer control, Hex Layers (tones with up to 6 simultaneous instruments) and sound editing capabilities, similar to that of PX-5S. Unlike the PX-5S, this model is equipped with built-in speakers.

Footnotes
  (see Technical Specifications tab on each product)

External links

 Privia
 Privia Intl.
 Privia USA
 Privia Europe

Digital stage pianos
Casio brands
Casio musical instruments